Serge Danot (7 February 1931 – 23 December 1990) was a French animator and former advertising executive. He is best known for creating the animated series, Le Manège enchanté in 1964, which became known in its 1965 English-language version, written and narrated by actor Eric Thompson for the BBC as The Magic Roundabout. 

Danot was born in Nantes, France. As a young artist, he worked on the restoration of the Eiffel Tower and suffered an injury; while recuperating, he began practising animation. In 1969, he established his own company, called Danot Films. His partner in making The Magic Roundabout was a half-French, half-British animator, Ivor Wood.

Danot died in 1990.

References

1931 births
1990 deaths
French animators
French animated film directors
French animated film producers